

Lago di Luzzone is a reservoir in Ticino, Switzerland. It is located in the upper Blenio valley, in the municipalities of Ghirone and Aquila.

The reservoir is surrounded by peaks that rise more than 3,000 meters, and it is located at a height of 1,606 meters above sea level. The highest is Piz Terri (3,149 m), on the north-east side of the lake, followed by the Plattenberg (3,041 m), on the east side. The Torrone di Nav (2,832 m) overlooks the lake from the south side, while Pizzo Pianca (2,377 m) overlooks the lake from the north side.

The arch dam Luzzone was completed in 1963. In the years 1997–1998, its height was increased by 17 m. The dam is frequently used by the popular YouTube channel How Ridiculous to perform drop tests, and a Top Gear episode showed an occupied car doing a bungee jump.

One wall of the dam currently features the world's highest artificial climbing wall. A German manufacturer of climbing holds installed a line of over 650 artificial holds and bolts. The course covers a vertical distance of 165 meters, going from the base of the dam to the top. The climb must be done as a sport climb, in multiple pitches. Furthermore, the lowest holds were placed several meters above the ground to deter casual visitors from climbing on them.

See also
List of lakes of Switzerland
List of mountain lakes of Switzerland

References
Swisstopo topographic maps

Notes

External links
 
 Photos of the artificial climbing wall

Lakes of Ticino
Reservoirs in Switzerland